Gig Ryan, born Elizabeth Anne Martina Ryan November 5, 1956, is an Australian poet. She is a recipient of the Christopher Brennan Award.

Biography
Ryan was born in Leicester, England in 1956. Her father is the Australian surgeon Peter John Ryan.  

She was poetry editor of The Age newspaper 1998–2016. She has also recorded her songs with the bands Disband and Driving Past. Her book Pure and Applied won the 1999 C. J. Dennis Prize for Poetry and Heroic Money was shortlisted for the 2002 Kenneth Slessor Prize for Poetry. New and Selected Poems was shortlisted for the 2012 Prime Minister's Award for Poetry and the 2012 ASAL award, and winner of the 2012 Kenneth Slessor Prize for Poetry, and the 2011 Grace Leven Prize for Poetry.

Bibliography
 The Division of Anger Transit Press (1981)
 Manners of an Astronaut Hale and Iremonger (1984)
 The Last Interior Scripsi Magazine (1986)
 Excavation PanPicador Australia (1990)
 Pure and Applied Paper Bark Press / Craftsman House (1998)
 "Research" Folio/Salt (1999)
 Heroic Money Brandl & Schlesinger (2001)
 New and Selected Poems Giramondo (2011)
 Selected Poems Bloodaxe Books (UK) (2012)

Discography
 "Six Goodbyes"  Disband, Big Home Productions (1988)	
 "Church Fete"  Driving Past, Chapter Music (1998)	
 "Real Estate"  Driving Past, Chapter Music (1999)	
 "Travel"  Driving Past, Jacana Records (2006)

References

External links 
 The Division of Anger online at Australian Literary Resources
 Poems and Vietnamese translations
 Three poems at Jacket Magazine
 Two poems at Jacket Magazine
 Dignitaries poem at Slope Magazine
 And the foetid air and gritty: Les Murray's Subhuman Redneck Poems
 Uncertain Possession: The Politics and Poetry of Judith Wright
 Uncertain Possession: the Politics and Poetry of Judith Wright
      Evil Has No Witnesses: Pramoedya Ananta Toer
 Pramoedya Ananta Toer
 
 http://cordite.org.au/tags/gig-ryan/ Cordite Poetry Review
 Martin Johnston 1947-1990
 Driving Past Band homepage
   Real Estate, Driving Past (1999),Chapter Music
  Church Fete, Driving Past (1998), Chapter Music
  Travel, Driving Past (2006)
  Travel, Driving Past (2006)
  Exhibit B, compilation album, H. Records (1997)
  Truth Against The World, compilation album, 555 Recordings (1998)
  Double Figures, compilation album, Chapter Music (2002)
  Melbourne Water, compilation album, Volume One, W.Minc label (2004)
  Empress Hotel, compilation album, 555 Recordings, Red Square (2009)

1956 births
Living people
Australian literary critics
Poets from Melbourne
Australian women literary critics
Australian women poets